Wilmer Fred Adams (October 2, 1911 – September 30, 1992) was an American professional basketball player. He played in the National Basketball League for the Fort Wayne General Electrics during the 1937–38 season. Adams averaged 3.6 points per game.

References

1911 births
1992 deaths
American men's basketball players
Basketball players from Fort Wayne, Indiana
Fort Wayne General Electrics players
Forwards (basketball)
20th-century American people